Stephane Assengue (born May 23, 1990) is a Cameroonian footballer.

Career
Assengue started his career in his native Cameroon with regional team Daga Young Stars before being signed by Major League Soccer side New England Revolution on March 26, 2009.

He made his MLS debut on May 3, 2009, coming on as a second-half substitute for Kheli Dube in a game against Houston Dynamo. He was waived at the end of the 2009 MLS season, having featured in only two games for the Revolution. In 2014, he signed with Kingston FC of the Canadian Soccer League.

References

External links
 MLS player profile

1990 births
Living people
Association football forwards
Cameroonian expatriate sportspeople in the United States
Cameroonian footballers
Canadian Soccer League (1998–present) players
Kingston FC players
Major League Soccer players
New England Revolution players
CS Mont-Royal Outremont players